Bump is a British animated children's television series which was created by Charles Mills and Terry Brain (who had previously created The Trap Door and Stoppit and Tidyup), produced by Queensgate Productions and originally shown on BBC One from 14 September 1990 to 26 December 1994.

The series' two main protagonists were the eponymous Bump (an elephant who was very clumsy, a trait that was emphasised by a bandage stuck onto his forehead) and his friend Birdie (a bluebird who often gave Bump advice on how he could become more graceful). The two series ran a total of twenty-six episodes, each 5 minutes long. The twenty-seventh and final episode was a Christmas special that was 10 minutes long. The programme was narrated by Simon Cadell (1950-1996) of Hi-de-Hi! fame.

Bump and Birdie regularly encountered animals that had a problem (such as Whizzer the mouse, Munch the tortoise, McDuff the dog, Big Bun and Little Bun the rabbits and Batty the bat) and would help them to find a solution. Most of these animals were recurring characters, and all of the characters' Stoppit and Tidyup-like sounds were generated by analogue synthesizers.

Characters
Bump
Birdie
Whizzer
Big Bun and Little Bun
McDuff
Munch
Batty
Mr and Mrs Squirrel
Old Bear
Auntie Doreen
Birdie’s Brothers and Sisters
Cousin Jay
Puss

Episodes

Series 1 (1990)
All thirteen of the first series' episodes were initially shown on BBC One as part of the Children's BBC strand on Fridays at 3:50pm.

Series 2 (1994)
All thirteen of the second series' episodes were initially screened on BBC One, again as part of the Children's BBC strand, on Mondays at 3:45pm, and although they were produced in 1993, they were not broadcast until 10 January 1994. The sixteenth episode was also renamed to just "Aunty Doreen's Surprise" when shown in the United States, while the twenty-fifth one was renamed to "Bump and the Builder".

Christmas special (1994)
The twenty-seventh episode was initially shown on BBC One, once again as part of the Children's BBC strand, on Boxing Day 1994 at 7:55am.

Broadcast history
United Kingdom: After the series finished its original run on BBC One, it was later repeated on BBC Two, The Children's Channel, Nickelodeon (alongside that network's own cartoons from that time period, Doug, The Ren & Stimpy Show, Rugrats, Rocko's Modern Life and Aaahh!!! Real Monsters) and CBeebies.
Australia: When the series was exported to Australia, it was shown on ABC, Nickelodeon (alongside their cartoons) and Nick Jr.
South Africa: When the series was exported to South Africa, it was broadcast on SABC2 and e.tv over there.
Singapore: When the series was exported to Singapore, it was screened on Mediacorp Channel 5 in that country.
New Zealand: When the series was exported to New Zealand, it was transmitted on TVNZ Kidzone for that country.
Republic of Ireland: When the series was exported to the Irish Republic, it was seen on RTÉ2 in that country.
Canada: When the series was exported to Canada, it was screened on both YTV and YTV Jr. in all provinces, as well as airing on Knowledge Network in British Columbia.
Germany: When the series was exported to Germany, it was seen on the military television network BFBS (and SSVC Television, which was the name the aforementioned BFBS network was known by between 1985 and 1997).
India: When the series was exported to India, it was screened on Discovery Kids there.

Credits

Series 1
Narrated by: Simon Cadell
Animation: CMTB Animation
Artwork & Music: Steve Augarde
Stories by: Christopher James
Executive Producer: Theresa Plummer-Andrews
Produced by: Dennis Hooper
© Bump Enterprises Ltd. 1990

Series 2
Stories by: Christopher James
Narrated by: Simon Cadell
Animated by: CMTB Animation
Edited by: Nick Upton
Art & Music: Steve Augarde
Art Director: Peter Corri
Executive Producer for the BBC: Theresa Plummer-Andrews
Executive Producer for Abbey Broadcast Communications Plc: Anne Miles
Directed by: Terry Brain
Produced by: Dennis Hooper
© Bump Enterprises Ltd. 1993
An Abbey Broadcast Communications Plc. Videal Productions - GMBH Production
© Abbey Broadcast Communications Plc. Videal Productions - GMBH 1993

UK VHS releases
Two VHS tapes, which contain all thirteen episodes of the first series between them, were released by Abbey Home Media in the UK in 1991. The first one was later reissued on DVD under the title Bump: My First DVD in 2004 (three episodes from the second series and the Christmas special were also released on another DVD, Bump: Christmas Story, in 2006, but they were never previously released on VHS).

References

External links

Bump at Toonhound

BBC children's television shows
British children's animated adventure television series
English-language television shows
Animated television series about elephants
Animated television series about birds
1990s British children's television series
1990 British television series debuts
1994 British television series endings
1990s British animated television series